Rachel Cohen-Kagan (19 February 1888 – 15 October 1982) was a Zionist activist and Israeli politician, and one of only two women to sign the Israeli Declaration of Independence.

Biography
Rachel Lubersky (later Cohen-Kagan) was born in the city of Odessa in the Russian Empire (today in Ukraine), Cohen-Kagan attended university in her home city, and was also granted an honorary degree from the Hebrew University of Jerusalem. She immigrated to Mandatory Palestine in 1919 on board the ship Ruslan, and became involved in the Women's International Zionist Organization (WIZO).

In 1932, she was appointed chairwoman of the Committee for Social Aid in the Community Committee of Haifa, a role she held until 1946. In 1938, she was elected chairwoman of WIZO, and became more involved in politics. In 1946 she was appointed director of the Social Department of the Jewish National Council. A member of Moetzet HaAm, in 1948 Cohen-Kagan was one of only two women (the other was Golda Meir) to sign the Israeli declaration of independence.

In the first Knesset elections in 1949, WIZO won a single seat, which was taken by Cohen-Kagan. During her first term in the Knesset, she was the sponsor of the first legislation promoting equal rights for women. However, she lost her seat in the 1951 elections.

After later joining the Liberal Party, she returned to the Knesset on its list following the 1961 elections. However, Cohen-Kagan was one of the seven MKs that broke away from the party to found the Independent Liberals in opposition to the impending merger with Herut. She lost her seat in the 1965 elections.

Cohen-Kagan had two children. She died in October 1982 at the age of 94.

References

External links
 

1888 births
1982 deaths
Odesa Jews
Ukrainian emigrants to Mandatory Palestine
Women members of the Knesset
Jewish National Council members
Members of the Assembly of Representatives (Mandatory Palestine)
Members of the 1st Knesset (1949–1951)
Members of the 5th Knesset (1961–1965)
Signatories of the Israeli Declaration of Independence
Leaders of political parties in Israel
Liberal Party (Israel) politicians
Women's International Zionist Organization politicians
Independent Liberals (Israel) politicians
20th-century Israeli women politicians